Temnora is a genus of moths in the family Sphingidae.

Species
Temnora albilinea Rothschild, 1904
Temnora angulosa Rothschild & Jordan, 1906
Temnora argyropeza (Mabille, 1879)
Temnora atrofasciata (Holland, 1889)
Temnora avinoffi Clark, 1919
Temnora bouyeri Cadiou, 2003
Temnora burdoni Carcasson, 1968
Temnora camerounensis Clark, 1923
Temnora crenulata (Holland, 1893)
Temnora curtula Rothschild & Jordan, 1908
Temnora dierli Cadiou, 1997
Temnora elegans (Rothschild, 1895)
Temnora elisabethae Hering, 1930
Temnora engis Jordan, 1933
Temnora eranga (Holland, 1889)
Temnora fumosa (Walker, 1856)
Temnora funebris (Holland, 1893)
Temnora grandidieri (Butler, 1879)
Temnora griseata Rothschild & Jordan, 1903
Temnora hollandi Clark, 1920
Temnora iapygoides (Holland, 1889)
Temnora inornatum (Rothschild, 1894)
Temnora kaguru Darge, 2004
Temnora leighi Rothschild & Jordan, 1915
Temnora livida Holland, 1889
Temnora marginata (Walker, 1856)
Temnora masungai Darge, 2009
Temnora mirabilis Talbot, 1932
Temnora murina Walker, 1856
Temnora namaqua Rothschild & Jordan, 1903
Temnora natalis Walker, 1856
Temnora nephele Clark, 1922
Temnora nitida Jordan, 1920
Temnora ntombi Darge, 1975
Temnora palpalis Rothschild & Jordan, 1903
Temnora peckoveri (Butler, 1876)
Temnora plagiata Walker, 1856
Temnora probata Darge, 2004
Temnora pseudopylas (Rothschild, 1894)
Temnora pylades Rothschild & Jordan, 1903
Temnora pylas (Cramer, 1779)
Temnora radiata (Karsch, 1893)
Temnora rattrayi Rothschild, 1894
Temnora reutlingeri (Holland, 1889)
Temnora robertsoni Carcasson, 1968
Temnora rungwe Darge, 2004
Temnora sardanus (Walker, 1856)
Temnora scheveni Carcasson, 1968
Temnora scitula (Holland, 1889)
Temnora spiritus (Holland, 1893)
Temnora stevensi Rothschild & Jordan, 1903
Temnora subapicalis Rothschild & Jordan, 1903
Temnora swynnertoni Stevenson, 1938
Temnora trapezoidea Clark, 1935
Temnora turlini Darge, 1975
Temnora uluguru Darge, 2004
Temnora wollastoni Rothschild & Jordan, 1908
Temnora zantus (Herrich-Schaffer, 1854)

 
Macroglossini
Moth genera
Taxa named by Francis Walker (entomologist)